Castillejo de Mesleón is a municipality located in the province of Segovia, Castile and León, Spain.

References

Municipalities in the Province of Segovia